The 2021 Monte Carlo Rally (also known as the 89e Rallye Automobile Monte-Carlo) was a motor racing event for rally cars that was held over four days between 21 and 24 January 2021. It marked the eighty-ninth running of the Monte Carlo Rally, and was the first round of the 2021 World Rally Championship, World Rally Championship-2 and World Rally Championship-3. The 2021 event was based in the town of Gap in the Hautes-Alpes department of France.

Thierry Neuville and Nicolas Gilsoul were the defending rally winners. Their team, Hyundai Shell Mobis WRT, were the reigning manufacturers' winners. Mads Østberg and Torstein Eriksen were the defending winners in the WRC-2 category, while Eric Camilli and François-Xavier Buresi were the defending rally winners in the WRC-3 category. Østberg and Eriksen did not defend their WRC-2 title as they did not enter the rally. Camilli and Buresi did not defend their WRC-3 win as they entered in the WRC-2 category.

Sébastien Ogier and Julien Ingrassia won the rally, their eighth win in Monte Carlo. The result saw them set a new record for wins in Monte Carlo. Andreas Mikkelsen and Ola Fløene won the World Rally Championship-2 category, while Yohan Rossel and Benoît Fulcrand were the winners in the World Rally Championship-3.

Background

Entry list
The following crews were entered into the rally. The event was open to crews competing in the World Rally Championship, its support categories, the World Rally Championship-2 and World Rally Championship-3, and privateer entries that were not registered to score points in any championship. Ten crews were entered under Rally1 regulations, as were eighteen Rally2 crews; of these, seven were nominated to score points in the World Rally Championship-2 and eleven in the World Rally Championship-3.

Route
The rally was originally planned to be run over sixteen stages, but was reduced to fifteen amid concerns over organisers' ability to run the event during the COVID-19 pandemic, and ultimately to fourteen so as to respect the curfew established throughout France from 6 p.m. to 6 a.m.

Itinerary
All dates and times are CET (UTC+1).

Report

World Rally Cars

Classification

Special stages

Championship standings

World Rally Championship-2

Classification

Special stages

Championship standings

World Rally Championship-3

Classification

Special stages

Championship standings

Notes

References

External links
  
 2021 Monte Carlo Rally at eWRC-results.com
 The official website of the World Rally Championship

2021 in French motorsport
2021 in Monegasque motorsport
2021 World Rally Championship season
January 2021 sports events in France
2021
Sports events curtailed due to the COVID-19 pandemic